The General Council of the Assemblies of God of India is a Pentecostal Christian denomination in India. It is affiliated with the World Assemblies of God Fellowship. The headquarters is in Chennai, Tamil Nadu.

History
The General Council of the Assemblies of God of India has its origins in a mission of the Assemblies of God USA in Chennai in 1915.  The council was founded in 1995. In 2016, it had 5,200 churches.

Bible Colleges and schools 
Bible Colleges and schools affiliated with the Assemblies of God India:

 Centre for Global Leadership Development, Bangalore, Karnataka
 Southern Asia Bible College
 Global School of Open Learning
 Global School of Counselling
 Global School of Media, Arts and Communication
 Bethel Bible College, Punalur, Kerala
 Trinity Bible College, Kozhikode
 Buntain Theological College, Kolkata
 Karnataka Institute of Theology, Chitradurga, Karnataka
 Antioch Bible Seminary and College, Pondicherry
 A.G. Tamilnadu Bible College, Madurai, Tamil Nadu
 Madras Bible College, Chennai, Tamil Nadu
 Antioch Biblical Seminary & College, Pondicherry.
 Southwestern India Bible College, Junnar, Maharashtra
 Trinity Bible College, Kanakapillaivalasai, Tamilnadu
 Assembly of God Theological Training Centre Jabalpur.
Assembly of God English medium School Jabalpur.

See also 
Christianity in India
History of Pentecostalism in India

References

External links
 Official Website

1995 establishments in India
Pentecostalism in India
India
Pentecostal denominations in Asia